The Circular or Yellow line (code Y) is a metro line operated by Taipei Metro. This initial section was opened on 31 January 2020. Hitachi Rail Italy supplied 17 sets of 4-car driverless medium-capacity trains for the line.

Construction 
Hitachi Rail STS supplied electromechanical equipment for the line, including driverless technology and CBTC signaling. , currently the only underground station on the line, was constructed by RSEA Engineering Corporation and employed the cut-and-cover method.

Construction for the first phase officially broke ground on 11 July 2011 on a  elevated section between Zhonghe and Banqiao. The section is estimated to cost NT$13.7 billion, with the entire first-stage  route estimated to cost NT$54.7 billion to construct.

Stations in operation 
The western section of the line officially opened on 31 January 2020.

Stations under construction
The north and south sections are approved for construction.  Currently under construction, with estimated completion in 2029.

South section 
Stations Y01–06 are approved for construction. (Unopened stations' names are to be confirmed)

North section 
Stations Y21–32 are approved for construction. (Unopened stations' names are to be confirmed)

Planned stations
The east section is still under planning and subject to change. After this section is complete, the Circular line will go in a circle.

East section 
(Unopened stations' names are to be confirmed)

See also 
Rail transport in Taiwan

Notes

References 

Taipei Metro
Standard gauge railways in Taiwan
Railway lines opened in 2020